Small Ensemble Music (Wesleyan) 1994 is a live album by composer and saxophonist Anthony Braxton with a rotating group of musicians forming trios, a duo and sextet, recorded at Wesleyan University in 1994 and released on the Italian Splasc(H) label.

Reception

The Allmusic review by  Steve Loewy stated "this CD fills an important gap in the work of Braxton by focusing on his non-quartet work of the mid-90s. Actually taken from a single concert of duo, trio, and quartet performances, the compositions are characteristically complex, though absorbingly and fascinatingly so. While the level of his classic quartet recordings is hard to beat, these small groups give a different view of the composer/performer – one laced with abstraction and densely layered harmonies". On All About Jazz Glenn Astarita noted "Throughout, the musicians spew forth-fascinating themes that often convey a sense of fragility or innocence yet with Braxton, we tend to gaze in wonderment at the end results".

Track listing
All compositions by Anthony Braxton.
 "Trio Improvisation" – 8:53
 "Composition N° 107" – 20:24
 "Duo Improvisation" – 6:42
 "Three Compositions for Sextet: Composition N° 44 (108D+96)+168/Composition N° 136/Composition N° 43 +(96)+168" – 21:23

Personnel
 Anthony Braxton – sopranino saxophone, soprano saxophone, alto saxophone, C melody saxophone, bass saxophone, flute, clarinet, contrabass clarinet
 André Vida – baritone saxophone, tenor saxophone (track 1)
 Brandon Evans – bass clarinet, oboe, shehnai (track 1)
 Jeanne Chloe – piano (track 2)
 Roland Dahinden (track 2), Mike Heffley (track 4) – trombone
 Ted Reichman – accordion (track 3)
 Jason Wong – violin (track 4)
 Joe Fonda – bass (track 4)
 Kevin Norton – drums, vibraphone (track 4)

References

Anthony Braxton live albums
1999 live albums